You Gotta Move may refer to:

 "You Gotta Move" (song), a song by Mississippi Fred McDowell, notably covered by the Rolling Stones
 You Gotta Move (video), a DVD by Aerosmith
 "You Gotta Move", a song by Heatmiser from Mic City Sons

See also
 You Got to Move, a documentary about social change in the American South